Malyoun (Album)  (English: Million) (Arabic: مليون) is the third studio album by Jordanian rock band JadaL. It was released in July 2016. This album  contains 12 tracks the Album was launched for first time on 28 July 2016 at Amman Citade Jabal al-Qal'a, (جبل القلعة). Composed and written by Mahmoud Radaideh.

Track listing

References

JadaL albums
2016 albums